David Dephy (born June 21, 1968), also known as David Dephy Gogibedashvili, is a Georgian / American poet, novelist, essayist, performer, multimedia artist, painter, the founder of Poetry Orchestra and the poetic order Samcaully. He is the author of eight novels and seventeen collections of verse and three poetry bilingual audio albums with orchestra and electronic bands. Named as Literature Luminary by Bowery Poetry, Stellar Poet by Voices of Poetry, Incomparable Poet by Statorec, Brilliant Grace by Headline Poetry & Press and Extremely Unique Poetic Voice by Cultural Daily. He lives and works in New York City, USA.

Biography 

David Dephy was born in Tbilisi. He earned his undergraduate degree in 1992 from the Faculty of Architecture at the Tbilisi State Academy of Fine Arts. He began his career working in print media, radio, and television, where he created the program მზეRA (Mze-Ra) for the Georgian television station Meore Archi. From 1995 to 2000 he worked in cinema, collaborating with internationally famous film directors Otar Ioseliani and Nana Jorjadze, among others.

He was a leader of Disobedience Committee during the Rose Revolution in 2003 and during the Russian invasion of Georgia in 2008, he joined the army of volunteers and set up a Headquarters of Civil Solidarity under his famous slogan "Stop Russia."

In 2010-2011 Dephy was an artist-in-residence at the writers’ society Ledig House in Ghent, New York. In 2011 his short story "Before the End" was selected for inclusion in Dalkey Archive Press's Best European Fiction series, as well as in Dalkey's anthology Contemporary Georgian Fiction, edited and translated by Elizabeth Heighway. That same year Dephy was invited to participate in the PEN World Voices Festival in New York City, where he presented a live poetry event entitled "The Second Skin" with Laurie Anderson, Yusef Komunyakaa and Salman Rushdie at the Unterberg Poetry Center, 92nd St Y.

Dephy's works have been published and anthologized in the U.S., UK, Mexico, Germany, Brazil. India, Ukraine, Georgia, New Zealand, Colombia by the many literary magazines, journals, and publishing houses. From 2015-2017 he served as the Creative Consultant for Poetry & Prose at the University of Georgia. In 2017 he was chosen as an Ambassador of Poetry by Julius Meinl, and his live performance of The Poet King – The Easter Verses at the Peace Cathedral of Georgia and the Evangelical-Baptist Church of Georgia led to his poetry officially being included in the Divine Liturgies. Dephy was collaborating with Georgian rock bands Lady Heroin, The Sanda and Homospouses on a bilingual English/Georgian multimedia projects.

His short story "Before The End" was chosen for inclusion in the anthology Best European Fiction 2012, edited by  Aleksandar Hemon and prefaced by Nicole Krauss, and published in the U.S. by[Dalkey Archive Press]

David Dephy is an author of seventeen books of poetry, eight novels and three audio albums of poetry in Georgian and English languages. His first book-length works in English, a poetry Eastern Star, have been published in USA on October 28, 2020 from Adelaide Books New York, also his book-length work in English, a poetry - written with Joshua Corwin - A Double Meaning, has been published on August 14, 2022 by Adelaide Books New York as well. 

He is a founder of poetic multimedia project Poetry Orchestra, which is named as "A Triumphant", "A Revolutionary" and "An Innovation in the World of Poetry" by Cultural Daily Los Angeles. An active collaborator with Saphileaum and Irakli Gabriel.

He is a Featured Poet and Stipend Recipient at Walt Whitman Birthplace Association 2023 Huntington Station, New York. His poetry work A Sense of Purpose is going to the Moon by The Lunar Codex, NASA, SpaceX,  Polaris Trilogy and Poetry on Brick Street in 2024. 

He lives and works in New York City.

Prizes won: 

The Nelson Mandela Premium Award 2022. On the occasion of Nelson Mandela International Day, July 18 - "In recognition of the valuable contribution to the promotion of Peace and Equality through Literature, especially in support of Ukraine during this unfortunate war." The International Forum for Creativity and Humanity Kingdom of Morocco.

The Pushcart Prize Nomination for the poetry work Time Is Heart published by Brownstone Poets Anthology, 2023. New York, USA.

The 1st Place Winner of The Artists Forum Poetry Award, 2021. New York, USA.

The Finalist and Shortlist Winner Nominee of the Adelaide Literary Awards New York for the category of Best Poem. 2020/2021. USA. 

A Winner of the Finalist Award in the 2020 Best Book Award National Contest by American Book Fest. USA.  

A Winner of the 2019 Spillwords Press Poetry American Award as June’s Publication of the Month. Spillwords Press. New York, USA.  

The Favorite Poem, 2020 by Dissonance Magazine. Kent, UK. 

The Finalist of the Adelaide Literary Award Anthology, 2019 for the category of Best Poem. Adelaide Books/Adelaide Magazine. New York, USA. 

The Editor's Choice Poem 2019 by Vita Brevis Magazine. New York, USA. 

Has been nominated as an Author of The Year/Month by Spilwords Press, four-time in a row, 2019/2020. New York, USA.  

Best European Fiction 2012, edited by Aleksandar Hemonand prefaced by Nicole Krauss, Dalkey Archive Press. Chicago, USA. 

By decree #11-16-04 of November 16, 2013 of the President of Georgia Mikheil Saakashvili, David Dephy had been awarded The Order of Honour (certificate #081887 The Order of Honour #1737)

Named as Literature Luminary by Bowery Poetry, Stellar Poet by Voices of Poetry]], Incomparable Poet by Statorec, Brilliant Grace by Headline Poetry & Press and Extremely Unique Poetic Voice by Cultural Daily.

Poetry & Prose Major Publications 
1994: Dead Time, essays
1995: The Grotesque, stories
1996: Stories and Conceptions, stories & essays
2003: The December Talisman, a novel
2003: Expecting Miracles At Dawn, a novel
2003: Emerald and Sapphire, poems
2003: Words Words Words, dialogues
2003: Let My Twin Find Me, a novel
2004: The Ravage Trilogy: And, There, and Heaven, poems
2007: Samkauly, poems
2008: Demna Gedevanischvili, a novel
2009: Shinings, poems
2010: Da Iq Tsa, poems
2010: DNA Symphony, poems
2010:The Gardens and the Pandemonium, a novel
2011: Sevdya, poems
2012: Before the End, Contemporary Georgian Fiction and Best European Fiction 2012; English language translation by Elizabeth Heighway
2012: Demna, a novel
2012: We Will All Get Out Of Here Alive, poems
2014: All the World’s Mysteries, a novel
2014: The Society of the End and the Beginning, a novel
2014: God Is Among You, poems
2015: The Easter Verses, poems
2015: Absolute New York, poems
2016: The Poet King, a poem
2016: Crowned, a novel
2018: The Same Fable, poems
2020: Eastern Star, poems
2022: A Double Meaning, a poem

2023: The Songs of the American Prophets, a concept audio album by Poetry Orchestra

Video Art & Multi-Media Projects 
1992-1994: მზე-RA  | Director David Dephy
1997: Carlos Castaneda's Separate Reality | Director David Dephy
1998-2002: Open Door Night | Director David Dephy
1999-2002: Hero | Director David Dephy
2017 - ongoing: Poetry Orchestra by David Dephy

Filmography 
1993: Mandalla | Director Mamuka Berika
1996: Winner of the Grand Prix at the Venice Film Festival
1996: Brigands, Chapitre VII | Director Otar Ioseliani
2000: 27 Missing Kisses | Director: Nana Jorjadze
2002: Drongo | Director: Zinovi Roizman
2004: Delirium | Director: Tornike Bziava

References

 Poetry Orchestra - Poetic Experience Perfected - 5 star review about David Dephy's project Poetry Orchestra by John Dennis in Cultural Daily Magazine, California, USA
 Poets on Craft by Cultural Daily - David Dephy and Wayne Miller
 Shine On Eastern Star - 5 star review about Eastern Star by Linda Galbraith in Cultural Daily Magazine, California, USA
 American poets about David Dephy
 Adelaide Books USA New York David Dephy
 Adelaide Magazine USA New York David Dephy

External links
 
 
 Adelaide Books USA New York David Dephy
 Stanford University USA California David Dephy
 Columbia University USA New York David Dephy
 Artistic Freedom Initiative USA New York David Dephy 
 The Independent UK About David Dephy's The Chair

1968 births
Living people
21st-century poets from Georgia (country)
Tbilisi State Academy of Arts alumni
American male poets
21st-century male writers